The 1949 Portuguese presidential election was held on 13 February. 

Initially, incumbent president Óscar Carmona was due to face an opponent in General José Norton de Matos. However, the Salazar government subjected Norton de Matos and his followers to severe persecution. The intimidation progressed to the point that Norton de Matos pulled out of the contest just before election day. As a result, Carmona was reelected unopposed for a fourth consecutive term.

Results

Notes and references

See also
 President of Portugal
 Portugal
 Politics of Portugal

1949
Portugal
Presidential election
Portuguese presidential election